Peter McCallum (born Ayr, Scotland in 1992) is a Scottish rugby union player who plays for Ayrshire Bulls as a Number Eight.

Rugby Union career

Amateur career

McCallum has played for Ayr RFC since 2011 and is now the captain of the club. He has played for Ayr in the British and Irish Cup and the BT Premiership and against Scotland U20. He won BT Premiership Player of the season for 2015-16.

Professional career

McCallum played for Glasgow Warriors against Canada 'A' on 30 August 2016.

Since 2019 McCallum now captains and plays for Super 6 side Ayrshire Bulls.

International career

He has been called up for Scotland Club XV several times.

Outside rugby

McCallum is a Director of Tumax Storage.

References

External links 

Warriors debut caps fantastic year for Peter McCallum, The Herald
Statbunker Profile
Glasgow v Canada 'A' match report, Americas Rugby News

1992 births
Living people
Scottish rugby union players
Glasgow Warriors players
Ayr RFC players
Rugby union players from Ayr
Scotland Club XV international rugby union players
Rugby union number eights